Foreign Correspondent (a.k.a. Imposter and Personal History) is a 1940 American black-and-white spy thriller film directed by Alfred Hitchcock. It tells the story of an American reporter based in Britain who tries to expose enemy spies involved in a fictional continent-wide conspiracy in the prelude to World War II. It stars Joel McCrea and features 19-year-old Laraine Day, Herbert Marshall, George Sanders, Albert Basserman, and Robert Benchley, along with Edmund Gwenn.

Foreign Correspondent was Hitchcock's second Hollywood production after leaving the United Kingdom in 1939 (the first was Rebecca) and had an unusually large number of writers: Robert Benchley, Charles Bennett, Harold Clurman, Joan Harrison, Ben Hecht, James Hilton, John Howard Lawson, John Lee Mahin, Richard Maibaum, and Budd Schulberg, with Bennett, Harrison, Hilton and Benchley the only writers credited in the finished film. It was based on Vincent Sheean's political memoir Personal History (1935), the rights to which were purchased by producer Walter Wanger for $10,000.

The film was one of two Hitchcock films nominated for the Academy Award for Best Picture in 1940, the other being Rebecca, which went on to win the award. Foreign Correspondent was nominated for six Academy Awards, including one for Albert Basserman for Best Supporting Actor, but did not win any.

Plot

In mid-August 1939, just before the outbreak of World WarII, the editor of the New York Morning Globe, Mr. Powers (Harry Davenport), sends crime reporter John Jones, using the pen name "Huntley Haverstock" (Joel McCrea), to Europe to report on conditions there.  Jones's first assignment is to interview a Dutch diplomat named Van Meer (Albert Basserman), at an event held by Stephen Fisher (Herbert Marshall), the leader of the Universal Peace Party, who's holding the event to honor diplomat Van Meer. Unbeknownst to Powers and Jones, Fisher is actually a German agent.

Jones shares a cab with Van Meer on the way to the luncheon, but the diplomat evades any questions about the impending war. Once at the luncheon, Van Meer mysteriously disappears – his sudden absence announced by Fisher – but Jones doesn't mind as he becomes smitten with Fisher's daughter, Carol (Laraine Day). Powers sends Jones to Amsterdam to cover Van Meer's next appearance, at a conference of the UPP. When Jones stops to greet Van Meer outside the conference hall, Van Meer does not seem to recognize him. Suddenly, an assassin disguised as an eager photographer hoping to take a photo of the Dutch diplomat – actually concealing a gun near the camera – shoots and kills Van Meer. Jones, Carol and her reporter friend Scott ffolliott (George Sanders), give chase. They seem to lose the assassin's car in the countryside, until Jones recognizes that they are hiding in a windmill.

While Carol and ffolliott go for help, Jones searches the windmill and finds a live Van Meer; the man shot in front of witnesses was an imposter. The old man has been drugged and is unable to tell Jones anything. Jones narrowly escapes to tell the police himself, but when he, Carol and ffolliott return with authorities, Van Meer and his kidnappers are gone. Later, back at Jones's hotel room in Amsterdam, two spies dressed as police officers arrive to kidnap him. When he suspects who they really are, he escapes with Carol's help.

Jones and Carol board a British ship to England, and while a furious storm thunders overhead, he proposes marriage to her, which she accepts. In England, they go to Carol's father's house, where Jones sees Krug (Eduardo Ciannelli), whom he recognizes from the windmill as the operative running the assassination and kidnapping. He informs Fisher, who promises to provide a bodyguard who will protect him. The bodyguard, Rowley (Edmund Gwenn), whose true task is to kill Jones, is working with Fisher and Krug in the plot against Van Meer. Rowley tries to push Jones off the top of Westminster Cathedral tower but falls to his death himself.

Jones and ffolliott are convinced that Fisher is a traitor, so they come up with a plan: Jones will take Carol to Cambridge, and ffolliott will pretend she has been kidnapped, in order to force Fisher to divulge Van Meer's location. But when Carol, who mistakenly thinks that Jones tricked her to go to Cambridge – not for a romantic getaway,  but to sideline her while he pursues her father — returns home from Cambridge to her father earlier than expected; this forces ffolliott to leave in haste. ffolliott trails Fisher to a closed hotel where Van Meer is being held prisoner, but ffoliott is captured at gunpoint. He prevents Fisher from carrying out a ruse intended to persuade Van Meer to reveal a secret clause in a treaty that would benefit the Germans in the event of war. Fisher orders Van Meer to be tortured for the information; ffolliot escapes from Fisher's thugs, while Fisher flees. Van Meer is taken to a nearby hospital, where he slowly regains consciousness.

Britain and France declare war on Germany. Jones and ffolliott follow the Fishers on a Short S.30 Empire flying boat to America. When he intercepts a telegram intended for ffolliott, telling him that Van Meer has recovered and identified Fisher as his kidnapper, Fisher realizes he will soon be captured and returned to England as a spy. He confesses his treasonous behavior to Carol, who already suspects the truth but promises to stand by him. Jones pleads with Carol to rekindle their affair. Seconds later, the aircraft is shelled by a German destroyer and crashes into the ocean. The survivors perch on the floating wing of the downed aircraft. Realizing that it cannot support everyone, Fisher slips into the ocean to drown, sacrificing himself so the rest may live.

An American ship rescues the survivors. The captain refuses to allow the reporters to file their stories using the ship's communications, citing American neutrality in the war. Still, Jones, ffolliott, and Carol surreptitiously communicate the story by radio-telephone to Mr. Powers. Jones returns to England and, with Carol at his side, becomes a successful war correspondent. During a live radio broadcast, he describes London being bombed, urging Americans to "keep those lights burning" as they go dark in the studio.

Cast

 Joel McCrea as John Jones
 Laraine Day as Carol Fisher
 Herbert Marshall as Stephen Fisher
 George Sanders as ffolliott
 Albert Basserman as Van Meer
 Robert Benchley as Stebbins
 Edmund Gwenn as Rowley
 Eduardo Ciannelli as Mr. Krug
 Harry Davenport as Mr. Powers
 Martin Kosleck as Tramp
 Frances Carson as Mrs. Sprague
 Ian Wolfe as Stiles
 Charles Wagenheim as Assassin
 Edward Conrad as Latvian
 Charles Halton as Bradley
 Barbara Pepper as Dorine
 Emory Parnell as "Mohican" Captain
 Roy Gordon as Mr. Brood
 Gertrude Hoffman as Mrs. Benson
 Martin Lamont as Captain
 Barry Bernard as Steward
 Holmes Herbert as Asst. Commissioner
 Leonard Mudie as McKenna
 John Burton as English Announcer

Uncredited (in order of appearance)
 Crauford Kent as Toastmaster
 Jane Novak as Miss Benson
 Louis Borell as Captain Lanson
 Eily Malyon as English cashier
 E. E. Clive as Mr. Naismith
 Alexander Granach as Valet
 Jack Rice as Donald
 Hilda Plowright as Miss Pimm
 James Finlayson as Dutch peasant
 Joan Leslie as John Jones' sister

Alfred Hitchcock can be seen when Joel McCrea first spots Van Meer on the street in London; Hitchcock walks past reading a newspaper. Albert Basserman, who plays Van Meer, was German and did not speak English, so he had to learn all his lines phonetically. Likewise, one supposedly Dutch girl in the film speaks Dutch phonetically, though less convincingly.

Production

Producer Walter Wanger bought the rights to journalist Vincent Sheean's memoir Personal History in 1935, but after several adaptations proved unsatisfactory, Wanger allowed the story to stray significantly from the book. It took numerous writers and five years before Wanger had a script he was satisfied with, by which time Hitchcock was in the United States under contract with David O. Selznick and available to direct this film on a loan-out. Hitchcock, who did not enjoy working under the usual close scrutiny of Selznick, originally wanted Gary Cooper and Joan Fontaine for the lead roles, but Cooper was not interested in doing a thriller at the time, and Selznick would not loan out Fontaine. Later, Cooper admitted to Hitchcock that he had made a mistake in turning down the film.

Working titles for the film, which began production on March18, 1940, and initially finished on June 5, were "Personal History" and "Imposter". Shooting took place at the Samuel Goldwyn Studio in West Hollywood, and on location around Los Angeles and Long Beach.

After the film wrapped, Hitchcock visited his native England, and returned to Los Angeles on July 3, to report that the Germans were expected to begin bombing London at any time. To accommodate this, Ben Hecht was called in to write the epilogue of the film, the scene in the radio station, which replaced the original end sequence in which two of the characters discussed the events of the film on a transatlantic seaplane trip. The new ending was filmed on July 5, presciently foreshadowing the celebrated radio broadcasts of Edward R. Murrow.

Although many critics and film historians claim that neither Germany nor Hitler is named specifically in the film, both the man and the nation are indeed mentioned, including a scene where the name Germany is spelled out in the headline of a newspaper being hawked in the street and, while being given his assignment, Joel McCrea suggests an interview with Hitler, to get his views on the possibility of war. A fictional nation is mentioned numerous times however, possibly indicating that it was briefly considered as a potential proxy aggressor European country rather than an actual Axis nation.

One of the sequences in the film that continues to have a strong effect on viewers is the William Cameron Menzies-designed mid-ocean crash of the flying boat after it is shot down by a German destroyer. In 1972, in an interview with Dick Cavett, Hitchcock discussed some details of how the scene was created. Footage taken from a stunt aircraft diving over the ocean was rear-projected on rice paper in front of the cockpit set, while behind the rice paper were two chutes connected to large water tanks. The chutes were aimed at the windshield of the cockpit so that water would break through the rice paper at the right moment, simulating the crash of the aircraft into the ocean. However, during the crash sequence, studio lights can briefly be seen.

Hitchcock's eccentric marriage proposal to his wife Alma was written for this film, for the scene when Jones proposes to Carol.

Reception
Foreign Correspondent opened on August 16, 1940, in the United States and on October 11 of that year in the United Kingdom. The film, which ends with London being bombed, opened in the United States at the dawn of the Battle of Britain, just three days after the Luftwaffe began bombing British coastal airfields in the early Adlerangriff phase of the Battle of Britain, and a week before Germany began bombing London on August 24.

Box Office
Foreign Correspondent did well at the box office, but its high cost meant it incurred a loss of $369,973. According to Kinematograph Weekly it was the second most popular film of 1940 in Britain (the first being Rebecca).

Critical
It was generally praised by the critics, although some saw it as a glorified B movie. It also attracted attention from at least one professional propagandist, Nazi Propaganda Minister Joseph Goebbels, who called Foreign Correspondent "a masterpiece of propaganda, a first-class production which no doubt will make a certain impression upon the broad masses of the people in enemy countries".

On the review aggregator website Rotten Tomatoes, Foreign Correspondent has an approval rating of 95% based on 42 reviews, with an average score of 8.00/10. The site's critical consensus reads: "Alfred Hitchcock's Foreign Correspondent features a winning combination of international intrigue, comic relief, and some of the legendary director's most memorable set pieces." In his 2012 review, Saptarshi Ray of The Guardian wrote of Foreign Correspondent: "a breathless yarn with the most serious of intents that soars well beyond mediocrity but just below genius, yet remains a film that should be included on the master of suspense's top table."

Awards and honors

In 1941, Foreign Correspondent was nominated for six Academy Awards, but did not win any.

Foreign Correspondent was named one of the 10 Best Films of 1940 by Film Daily.

Adaptations
Foreign Correspondent was adapted to the radio program Academy Award Theater on July 24, 1946, with Joseph Cotten starring.

References

Bibliography

 Bernstein, Matthew. Walter Wanger: Hollywood Independent. Minneapolis, Minnesota: University of Minnesota Press, 2000.  .
 Humphries, Patrick. The Films of Alfred Hitchcock. New York: Crescent Books, 1994. .
 Legrand, Catherine and Robyn Karney. Chronicle of the Cinema. London: Dorling Kindersley, 1995. .

External links

 
 
 
 
 Foreign Correspondent at the Hitchcock Wiki
 
 Foreign Correspondent on Academy Award Theater: July 24, 1946
Foreign Correspondent: The Windmills of War an essay by James Naremore at the Criterion Collection

1940 films
1940s thriller films
American black-and-white films
American political thriller films
American spy thriller films
1940s Dutch-language films
1940s English-language films
Films about assassinations
Films about journalists
Films about kidnapping
Films directed by Alfred Hitchcock
Films produced by Walter Wanger
Films scored by Alfred Newman
Films set in 1939
Films set in England
Films set in the Netherlands
United Artists films
World War II spy films
1940s American films